Frédérick Bousquet (born 8 April 1981 in Perpignan) is a retired freestyle and butterfly swimmer from France. He was the holder of the world record in the 50 m freestyle in a time of 20.94 in long course, set on 26 April 2009 at the final of the French Championships. Since the record was swum in a banned, performance-enhancing suit it remained in limbo whether the record stood until FINA approved it in July following a modification of his suit. He is the first swimmer to go under the 21-second mark in this distance. He previously held the record in the 50 m short course in a time of 21.10, set in 2004 at the Men's NCAA Division One Swimming and Diving Championships, for over two years. At the 2009 World Championships in Rome Bousquet competed in the 50 and 100 free, capturing a silver in the 50 and bronze in the 100.
Bousquet did not qualify for the 2012 Olympics but his ex-partner Laure Manaudou and his brother-in-law Florent Manaudou did.

Biography
Bousquet swam at Auburn University in the U.S. from 2001 to 2005. In 2005, his senior year and final year of competition, he won the 50-yard freestyle in NCAA and U.S. Open record time of 18.74, shattering the previous record of 19.05 set by Tom Jager in 1990. Bousquet is the first man ever to swim the 50-yard freestyle in under 19 seconds, and under 21 in the LC 50-meter freestyle–he has since been joined by his former Auburn training partner César Cielo. That time of 18.74 seconds was his personal best in the 50-yard freestyle until 13 February 2010 when he swam the then fourth-fastest time in history, turning in a time of 18.67 seconds at the Auburn Masters Invitational.

In April 2010, fellow world-class swimmer Laure Manaudou gave birth to her and Bousquet's daughter Manon. The couple has separated since then. Bousquet was given a two-month suspension in October 2010 after returning a positive test for heptaminol from the use of an over-the-counter ointment.

See also
 World record progression 50m freestyle

References

External links
 
 

1981 births
Living people
Sportspeople from Perpignan
French male butterfly swimmers
French male freestyle swimmers
Olympic swimmers of France
Swimmers at the 2000 Summer Olympics
Swimmers at the 2004 Summer Olympics
Swimmers at the 2008 Summer Olympics
Swimmers at the 2016 Summer Olympics
Auburn Tigers men's swimmers
World record setters in swimming
Olympic silver medalists for France
World Aquatics Championships medalists in swimming
Medalists at the FINA World Swimming Championships (25 m)
European Aquatics Championships medalists in swimming
Medalists at the 2008 Summer Olympics
Doping cases in swimming
French sportspeople in doping cases
Olympic silver medalists in swimming
Mediterranean Games gold medalists for France
Swimmers at the 2005 Mediterranean Games
Swimmers at the 2009 Mediterranean Games
Mediterranean Games medalists in swimming